A bank is a financial institution and a financial intermediary that accepts deposits and channels those deposits into lending activities.

Bank, The Bank, or banking may also refer to:

Arts, entertainment, and media

Films
 DCI Banks, a British television crime drama, aired by ITV 2010-2016
 Overdrawn at the Memory Bank, a 1983 telemovie
 The Bank (1915 film), starring Charlie Chaplin
 The Bank (2001 film), starring David Wenham

Music
 "Bank", a 2017 song by Brockhampton from Saturation
"Bank", a 2018 song by Lil Baby from Harder Than Ever

Other media
 Memory Banks (comic strip), a British comic strip
 Memory Bank (UK game show), a daytime game show which was shown on Five in the UK

Finance
 Central bank
 Mutual savings bank
 Piggy bank, a device for money saving
 Savings bank

Organizations
 BANK (art collective), a 1990s London art collective
 Bank (diaper bank), organizations created for the purpose of distributing free diapers to parents and caregivers unable to afford diapers
 Bank Street College of Education, a private graduate school for Early Childhood Education in New York, NY, U.S.

Places

 Bánk, a village and municipality in the comitat of Nógrád, Hungary
 Bank, Iran, a city in Bushehr Province, Iran
 The Bank, Cheshire, a location in England
 Bank junction, a major road junction in the City of London
 Bank Station (OC Transpo), a bus stop in Ottawa
 Bank Street (Ottawa), Ontario, Canada
 Bank–Monument station, a tube station in London
 Bankə, Azerbaijan
 Promysel Narimanova or Bank, Azerbaijan

Science and technology

Computing
 Data bank, a storage area for information in telecommunications
 Memory bank, a logical unit of storage

Biology and healthcare
 Blood bank 
 Gene bank
 Ova bank
 Seed bank
 Sperm bank

Natural geography
 Bank (geography), a raised portion of seabed or sloping ground along the edge of a stream, river, or lake
 Ocean bank, a shallow area in a body of water

Transportation
 Bank engine, a railway locomotive attached to the rear of a train, usually to add haulage power over a short distance
 Bank or roll, in aircraft flight dynamics, a rotation of the vehicle about its longitudinal axis
 Banked turn, a change of direction in which a vehicle inclines
 Cylinder bank, a single row of cylinders in an internal combustion engine

Sport
 Bank shot, a type of shot in:
Basketball
Cue sports
 Citizens Bank Park or The Bank, a baseball stadium in Philadelphia, Pennsylvania, U.S.
 M&T Bank Stadium or The Bank, an American football stadium in Baltimore, Maryland, U.S.
 Bank of America Stadium or The Bank, an American football stadium in Charlotte, North Carolina, U.S.

Other uses
 Bank (surname), a surname
 Bank (fortification), a type of earthwork used in field defenses or around early hillforts
 Bank paper, thin paper

See also
 
 
 Banker (disambiguation)
 Banks (disambiguation)
 Banku (disambiguation)
 Cache (disambiguation)
 Embankment (disambiguation)
 Mitigation banking, or environmental mitigation, government-regulated environmental offset projects
 Phone bank (disambiguation)
 Ponding bank, a technique used in regenerative agriculture to prevent soil erosion
 Shore
 Storage (disambiguation)
 Vəng (disambiguation), several places in Azerbaijan
 East Bank (disambiguation)
 Left Bank (disambiguation)
 North Bank (disambiguation)
 Right Bank (disambiguation)
 South Bank (disambiguation)
 West Bank (disambiguation)